George Herbert Fryer (21 May 1877 – 7 February 1957) was an English pianist, teacher and composer.

Career
Fryer was born in Hampstead, London in 1877, the only son of three children. His father George Henry Fryer was an insurance broker. He was educated at Merchant Taylors' School, then went on for two years study (1893–95) under Oscar Beringer at the Royal Academy of Music (RAM). In 1894, Fryer won the Heathcote Long Prize. This was followed by four years of study (1895–1898) at the Royal College of Music (RCM), under Franklin Taylor.

In 1898, Fryer had some lessons with Ferruccio Busoni in Weimar. He also studied with Tobias Matthay. He made his London debut on 17 November 1898, and then commenced a career as a touring recitalist as well as an examiner for the Associated Board of the Royal Schools of Music. These tours took him all over Britain and Europe, and also to many parts of Canada, the United States, Australia (including the goldfields of Western Australia) South Africa, the Far East, and India. He was also a competition adjudicator. He was said to have travelled more than any other British pianist. He gave 50 recitals in London alone, said to have been a record. The King of Norway attended his recital in Christiania.

He played at the Proms on six occasions between 1901 and 1918, playing such works as Mozart's Piano Concerto No. 24, Beethoven's Piano Concerto No. 3, Tchaikovsky's Piano Concerto No. 1 and Concert Fantasia, and Brahms' Piano Concerto No. 2. His knowledge of the Brahms concerto was informed by the fact that his teacher Oscar Beringer had given the British premiere of the work in 1882.

In 1905, he took up a teaching position at the RAM, where he continued until 1914. His first tour of North America came in 1914, and he stayed there for three years, teaching at the Institute of Musical Art in New York (later merged with the Juilliard School). On his return to Britain in 1917, he was appointed Professor of Piano at the Royal College of Music, remaining in that post for the next 30 years, until 1947. Fryer's list of pupils was impressive. They included Arthur Bliss, Lance Dossor, Colin Horsley, Constant Lambert, Harold Rutland, Cyril Smith and Kendall Taylor. On retirement, he continued teaching privately above Blüthner's showrooms, and died in London in 1957, aged 79.

Fritz Fryer (1944–2007), lead guitarist of the British pop group The Four Pennies, was his grandson.

Students
Herbert Fryer's students are his greatest legacy:
 Trevor Barnard (born 1938), British-born Australian pianist and teacher
 John Bishop (1903–1964), best known as founder of the Adelaide Festival
 Arthur Bliss (1891–1975), composer
 Richard Bonynge (born 1930), conductor and husband of Dame Joan Sutherland
 Alex Burnard (1900–1971), Australian composer
 Philip Challis (1929–1996), pianist
 John Clegg (1928–2014), pianist 
 Lance Dossor (1916–2005), British-born pianist and teacher who emigrated to Australia in May 1953
 Philip Gammon, pianist 
 Colin Horsley (1920–2012), New Zealand-born pianist and teacher resident in the UK
 Leonard Isaacs (1909–1997), UK pianist and teacher who moved to Canada in 1963 
 John Kuchmy (1912-1988), Canadian pianist who worked in the UK 
 Constant Lambert (1905–1951), composer
 George Malcolm (1917–1997), pianist, organist, harpsichordist, and conductor
 Anthony Milner (1925–2002), composer
 David Parkhouse (1930–1989), pianist
 Phyllis Schuldt (1911–1982), UK-born pianist who worked in Canada
 Cyril Smith (1909–1974), pianist and teacher
 Kendall Taylor (1905–1999), pianist and teacher
 Glyn Townley (1911–2012), South African pianist

Recordings
Herbert Fryer made some recordings, both Welte-Mignon piano rolls and 78 rpm acoustic recordings for Vocalion. These include:
 Beethoven: Minuet in E flat
 Chopin: Trois nouvelles études; Prelude from Op. 28
 Dvořák: Humoresque in G flat
 MacDowell: Sea Pieces, Op. 55, recorded 1909
 Schumann: The Prophet Bird, from Op. 82

Compositions
His compositions are now little known. They include:
 Intermezzo, Op. 1 (1903)
 Étude-Caprice, Op. 9, No. 1
 Suite in Old Form, Op. 11, for piano (1910)
 Deux Morceaux de danse, Op. 12 (No. 1: Valse en ré; No. 2: Petite danse) (1912)
 Trois Préludes pour piano seul, Op. 16 (1914)
 Three Preludes, Op. 17
 Country Side. Suite for pianoforte, Op. 18 (1918)
 Transcriptions for Pianoforte of Old English Melodies from H. Lane Wilson's Collection, Op. 19 (1919)
 The Virgin's Cradle-Hymn, Op. 20, No. 1
 Five Transcriptions from Bach, Op. 22 (all from his Suites for solo cello):
 Bourrée & Gigue from Suite No. 3 in C major, BWV 1009
 Sarabande from Suite for Suite No. 4 in E flat major, BWV 1010
 Sarabande & Gavotte from Suite No. 6 in D major, BWV 1012 (Jonathan Plowright has recorded the Sarabande; his live performance of it at the Wigmore Hall on 15 November 2008 can be heard )
 Six Little Variations on a Rigadoon by H. Purcell, Op. 21 (1922)
 piano arrangements of traditional Irish and English tunes
 Ah, Willow!
 My Love's an Arbutus

He wrote Hints on Pianoforte Practice (New York: G. Schirmer, 1916).

References

1877 births
1957 deaths
20th-century British male musicians
20th-century classical composers
20th-century classical pianists
Academics of the Royal Academy of Music
Academics of the Royal College of Music
Alumni of the Royal Academy of Music
Alumni of the Royal College of Music
English classical composers
English classical pianists
Male classical pianists
People educated at Merchant Taylors' School, Northwood
Piano pedagogues